Prasophyllum parviflorum, commonly known as the slender leek orchid, is a species of orchid endemic to eastern Victoria. It has a single tubular leaf and up to thirty greenish-brown to purplish flowers. Further studies of the species may indicate that some collections currently included may be of a different species.

Description
The flowers are greenish-brown to purplish and as with others in the genus, are inverted so that the labellum is above the column rather than below it. There is a broad, fleshy, glossy callus along the centre of the labellum and extending nearly to its tip. Flowering occurs in October and November.

Taxonomy and naming
The slender leek orchid was first formally described in 1930 by Richard Sanders Rogers who gave it the name Prasophyllum hartii var. parviflorum and published the description in Transactions and Proceedings of the Royal Society of South Australia from a specimen collected on Wilsons Promontory. In 1941, William Henry Nicholls raised the variety to species status.

Distribution and habitat
Prasophyllum parviflorum grows in grassland and grassy areas in woodland east from French Island to the New South Wales border. Specimens collected in the west of the state may be P. suaveolens and small plants may, with further studies, be shown to be a separate species.

Conservation
Prasophyllum parviflorum is listed as "Vulnerable" under the Victorian Flora and Fauna Guarantee Act 1988.

References

External links 
 

parviflorum
Flora of Victoria (Australia)
Endemic orchids of Australia
Plants described in 1930